Rhynchotherium is an extinct genus of proboscidea endemic to North America and Central America during the Miocene through Pliocene from 13.650 to 3.6 Ma, living for approximately .

This gomphothere had two tusks and may have evolved from Gomphotherium.

Taxonomy
Rhynchotherium was first described in 1868 on the basis of a lower jaw from the Miocene of Tlaxcala, Mexico. Later, the type species epithet R. tlascalae was erected for the jaw by Henry Fairfield Osborn in 1918. In 1921, a gomphothere skull from the Mt. Eden area of southern California was described as a subspecies of Trilophodon shepardi (a now-defunct combination for Mastodon shepardi), T. s. edensis, but was subsequently reassigned to Rhynchotherium. Other species subsequently assigned to Rhynchotherium included R. falconeri, R. paredensis, R. browni, and R. simpsoni. It was the closest relative to Cuvieronius, and may be ancestral to it.

Lucas and Morgan (2008) reviewed the taxonomy of Rhynchotherium and concluded that only R. edensis, R. falconeri, R. paredensis, R. browni, and R. simpsoni could be confidently referred to Rhynchotherium. Because the genotype of Rhynchotherium is referable to Gomphotherium, the ICZN was petitioned to conserve the genus by designating R. falconeri as the type species, which it did.

Misassigned species
 Mastodon shepardi Leidy, 1871
 Mastodon euhypodon Cope, 1884 - likely a species of Gomphotherium
 Tetrabelodon brevidens Cope, 1889
 Dibelodon praecursor Cope, 1893
 Rhynchotherium rectidens Osborn, 1923
 Aybelodon hondurensis Frick, 1933
 Blickotherium blicki Frick, 1933
 Rhynchotherium anguirivale Osborn, 1936
Phylogenetic position according to Mothé et al. (2016)

References

Gomphotheres
Miocene proboscideans
Pliocene proboscideans
Neogene mammals of North America
Prehistoric placental genera
Fossil taxa described in 1868